Janet Balaskas is an author, founder of the Active Birth Movement,<ref>See Kerreen Reiger, "Telling Tales: Health Professionals and Mother's Constructions of Choice in Childbirth," Sociological Sites/Sights, TASA 2000 Conference, Adelaide: Flinders University, Dec. 6-8, 2000 (note 1).</ref>   and childbirth educator.  She is perhaps known best for her advocacy of active birth where the woman is free to move during labour, rather than being placed into stirrups or the lithotomy position.  She coined the term active birth  which she explained in the first of her books Active Birth published in 1983.Susan Seneman, "Rebirthing Midwifery," New Directions for Women, v. 22, n. 4, pp. 7 (July-Aug. 1993)

Born in South Africa she is currently the Director of the Active Birth Centre in London, UK.

Bibliography

Books
 Active Birth. Unwin, London, 1983, 
 New Life - the book of exercises for childbirth. Sidgewick & Jackson, 1983
 The Active Birth Partners Handbook. Sidgewick & Jackson, 1984
 The Encyclopaedia of Pregnancy and Birth (with Yehudi Gordon). Macdonald Orbis, 1987
 Water Birth (with Yehudi Gordon). Unwin Hyman, 1991
 New Active Birth - A concise guide to natural childbirth. Thorsons, 1991, 

Articles
 Janet Balaskas, Sophie Hoare, Lyn Durward, Jo Garcia, and Caroline Langridge, "Birth Rights: Radical Consumerism in Health Care," Critical Social Policy'', v. 2, n. 5, pp. 62–65 (1982)

See also
 Childbirth positions
 Home birth
 Squatting position
 Water birth

References

External links
 Active Birth Centre

Natural childbirth advocates
Living people
Year of birth missing (living people)
South African emigrants to the United Kingdom